Hesamoddin Ashna (born 18 August 1964 in Tehran) is an Iranian politician. He is a former advisor to President Hassan Rouhani and a former head of Center for Strategic Studies. Ashna is described to be in Rouhani's inner circle and associated with the Moderation and Development Party.

Life
When he was 17, Ashna was a radio presenter on Radio Ahvaz. Then he studied both at Qom Seminary and Imam Sadiq University. He is married to the daughter of Ghorbanali Dorri-Najafabadi and was his deputy in Ministry of Intelligence. Ashna was a key figure in Rouhani presidential campaign (2013) and was appointed by Rouhani as his "cultural adviser" in October 2013 and as his "advisor" in August 2017. In response to the airstrike that killed Qassem Soleimani in January 2020, he stated that he wrote down a list of Trump properties to target.

He received his PhD from Imam Sadiq University in 2004 and now is a professor of communications at this university.

References

External links

Ashna's Weblog

1964 births
Living people
People from Tehran
Deputies of the Ministry of Intelligence (Iran)
Imam Sadiq University alumni
Presidential advisers of Iran
Academic staff of Imam Sadiq University
Communication scholars
Iranian radio presenters
Moderation and Development Party politicians
Islamic Revolutionary Guard Corps officers
Qom Seminary alumni